A European political foundation, formally a political foundation at European level, informally a Eurofoundation, is a research and advocacy organization close to, but independent from a Europarty. They are funded by the European Parliament. Their purpose is to act as platforms aiming at developing forward-looking ideas and concepts for their respective political family and providing a forum where those ideas can be widely debated. There are nine Eurofoundations as of 16 March 2009.

Timeline

2003
Regulation (EC) No 2004/2003 of the European Parliament and of the Council of 4 November 2003 defined what a Europarty, or political party at European level, was and tightened up their regulation.

2007
That regulation was later heavily amended by Regulation (EC) No 1524/2007 of the European Parliament and of the Council of 18 December 2007. That amendment provided for the earlier-floated concept of a political foundation at European level, a legally separate affiliate to a Europarty created to help them disseminate their principles to a wider audience.

An initial one million euros was allocated for pilot proposals, and Call For Proposals DG/EAC/29/2007 went out with a deadline of 28 September 2007. Ten organizations were picked (one for each Europarty) and money was allocated with an expiry date of 31 August 2008.

Regulations
As of 1 November 2008, the regulation governing Eurofoundations is Regulation (EC) No 2004/2003 of the European Parliament and of the Council of 4 November 2003, as later amended under codecision (see above). That regulation's European Commission factsheet is given here.

Funding
Their total allocated funding for 2008 is €5,000,000.

The Eurofoundations
Ten pilot Eurofoundations were set up in 2007/8, nine of which are still in existence as of 16 March 2009. They are as follows:

Proposed Eurofoundations
It was reported on 1 November 2008 that Declan Ganley had registered a company in Dublin called the Libertas Foundation Ltd and that it was intended "to act as a European Political Foundation for the Libertas Party". Ganley attempted to get EU recognition and funding of €111,000 for the Libertas Foundation in February 2009, but the attempt was rejected because its board members were all from one member state and the foundation name was the same as the aspirant Europarty also founded by Ganley. The same meeting of the Bureau of the European Parliament that rejected the Libertas foundation but (momentarily) recognised the Libertas party also defunded the Alliance of Independent Democrats in Europe (AIDE).

The foundation affiliated to the newly created Alliance of European Conservatives and Reformists is New Direction.

See also
 European political party

References

External links
Martens Centre website
Foundation for European Progressive Studies website
European Liberal Forum blog
Institute of European Democrats website
Transform Europe website
Coppieters Foundation website

European Union-related lists
Pan-European political parties